Tseng Chun-hsin (born 8 August 2001), also known as Jason Tseng, is a Taiwanese tennis player.

Tseng is currently the highest ranked Taiwanese player on the ATP tour. He has a career high ATP singles ranking of World No. 83, achieved on 8 August 2022.

He was also the ITF junior No. 1, first reaching this ranking on 11 June 2018 after winning the French Open Boys' Singles. He is also part of the Chinese Taipei Davis Cup team since 2018, with a W/L record of 1–0.

Early and personal life 
Tseng began playing tennis at the age of five with his father, who worked at a night market in Taiwan. He first trained in elementary school team located in Yonghe District, New Taipei City.

He is nicknamed "the Night Market Champion" by the Taiwanese media as his parents used to sell Tanghulu at the Lehua Night Market in New Taipei City in order to support his tennis career.

Career

Pre-2019: Junior years
He continued his training at the Mouratoglou Tennis Academy in France from age 13 to 17. During the period, He won singles title at the Petits As in 2015.

In 2018, He won his first ITF Futures event in Vietnam. He won the boys' singles title at the French Open and claimed the Wimbledon boys' singles title in the following month.

In the 2019 Summer Universiade, Tseng won the gold medal in men's singles.

2021–2022: Challenger breakthrough, Major & top 100 debut
In December 2021, Tseng won his first ATP Challenger title in Maia, Portugal. He made his debut in the top 200 at World No. 188 on 20 December 2021.

He made his Grand Slam debut at the 2022 Australian Open where he received a wildcard.

The following month in February 2022, Tseng won his second ATP Challenger title in Bangalore, India. In April 2022, Tseng won his third ATP Challenger title in Murcia, Spain. He reached a career-high ranking of World No. 110 on 16 May 2022.

He qualified for his second Grand Slam at the 2022 French Open to make his debut at this Major. He lost in the first round in five sets in a match that lasted 4 hours 23 minutes against João Sousa.

As a result of reaching the semifinals in Bratislava, Tseng made his debut in the top 100 at No. 97 on 13 June 2022.

ATP Challenger and ITF Futures finals

Singles: 11 (7–4)

Doubles: 1 (1–0)

Junior Grand Slam finals

Singles: 3 (2 titles, 1 runner-up)

Doubles: 1 (1 runner-up)

Performance timeline

Singles

References

External links

2001 births
Living people
Taiwanese male tennis players
French Open junior champions
Wimbledon junior champions
Tennis players at the 2018 Summer Youth Olympics
Sportspeople from New Taipei
Universiade medalists in tennis
Universiade gold medalists for Chinese Taipei
Universiade bronze medalists for Chinese Taipei
Grand Slam (tennis) champions in boys' singles
Medalists at the 2019 Summer Universiade
21st-century Taiwanese people